Little Thieves, Big Thieves is a 1998 Venezuelan gangster comedy film directed by Alejandro Saderman. The film was a considerable success in Germany.

Cast
Orlando Urdaneta ... Horacio 
Daniel Lugo ... Valmore 
Aroldo Betancourt ... Rogelio 
Mariano Álvarez ... Vicente 
Elluz Peraza ... Lucía Carvajal 
Flavio Caballero ... Juan Carlos 
Alicia Plaza... Rita 
Armando Gota ... Pujol 
Cayito Aponte ... Presidente del Banco 
Basilio Álvarez ... Chofer de Taxi

See also 
Venezuelan banking crisis of 1994

External links 
 

Venezuelan comedy films
1998 films
1990s black comedy films
1998 comedy films
1990s Spanish-language films